HMS Sphinx was a 24-gun sixth-rate frigate of the Royal Navy. The ship was built to the 1745 Establishment design drawn by the Surveyor of the Navy.

The ship was commissioned in September 1748 under Captain William Lloyd, and transported Governor Edward Cornwallis to Nova Scotia where he established Halifax. The ship served in Nova Scotia until early 1750, before being refitted at Sheerness. She then moved to the Mediterranean, before returning to Home Waters in 1751, where she was briefly off Ireland. In late 1751, now under Captain Edward Wheeler, she was deployed to the African coast and thence to Jamaica. Returned to England, she was refitted at Deptford in 1755 and then recommissioned under Captain James Gambier for a fresh deployment to Jamaica. On 3 December 1755, the Sphinx brought a French merchant vessel she had captured into Kingston. She returned to England in late 1758 under Captain John Dalrymple to pay off into reserve, seeing no further service until she was sold for breaking up in 1770.

References 

 David Lyon, The Sailing Navy List, Conway Maritime Press, London 1993. .
 Rif Winfield, British Warships in the Age of Sail, 1714 to 1792, Seaforth Publishing, London 2007. .

Frigates of the Royal Navy
1748 ships
Ships built on the River Thames